Nemes is the striped headcloth worn by pharaohs in ancient Egypt.

Nemes may also refer to:

 Nemes (surname)
 USS Nemes (SP-424), a United States Navy patrol boat commissioned in July 1917 and sunk in August 1917
Nemeš (born 1988), Serbian singer-songwriter

See also
 Nemes Furmint, a Hungarian wine grape